In Taiwan, the North–South divide refers to the uneven distribution of resources in regard to political, wealth, medical, economic development, education and other aspects across the country over past decades that has drawn the social and cultural differences between Northern Taiwan and Southern Taiwan today.

Causes
The divide has often been attributed to government bias. Following the Kuomintang's defeat by the Chinese Communist Party in the Chinese Civil War and the Nationalist's subsequent flight from the Chinese mainland, the Kuomintang relocated its headquarters to Taipei in the north of Taiwan.

Since the Nationalist government's retreat to Taiwan in 1949, the Kuomintang has held power for more than 60 years non-consecutively (1945–2000, 2008–2016), compared to the Democratic Progressive Party's 10 years (2000–2008, 2016-now). Owing to the Kuomintang's long-standing bias, especially over the White Terror period, the gap between the north and the south in terms of social economic development has gradually widened. Critics say that Northern Taiwan to which mainlanders fleeing after the defeat of the KMT on the Mainland had mainly relocated had a disproportionate share of economic investment, especially since the Pro-Independence movement was less common in the North than in the South. The KMT was alleged to have concentrated investment in technological fields in its base in Northern Taiwan, especially the Hsinchu and the Greater Taipei Metropolis area while investment in the South of Taiwan was mainly in industry. As industry relocated to Mainland China over the past decades leading to slower growth in Southern Taiwan, there has been a brain drain of younger college educated Taiwanese from the South to the North where higher paying service and technology industries are located.

Over the period 1990–1998, Mayor of Kaohsiung Wu Den-yih frequently criticized the KMT-led central government for its bias in favor of the north and against the south.

Studies also suggested that Kaohsiung, which is home to most of the heavy industry that fueled Taiwan's economic miracle, was also at the forefront of Taiwanese political liberalization activities from the 1970s onwards. Such activity includes the Kaohsiung Incident, which pushed Taiwan towards democracy, which some speculate lead to the Kuomintang government's decision to reduce southern Taiwan's economic development aid, as it regarded the protests in southern Taiwan as posing a great threat to its authoritarian rule.

Ethnic divisions between islanders and mainlanders

Historical tensions within Taiwan between ethnics mainlanders, Hoklo, and Hakka groups factor into the north–south divide in Taiwan.

Tianlongguo  
Tianlongguo (天龍國, "Celestial Dragon Country", also Tianlong) is a pejorative term referring to Taipei residents' apparent nobility or aloofness.  The term is based on the Celestial Dragon characters in the Japanese manga One Piece.

Differences

Political alignment

Traditionally, southwestern voters have favored pan-green parties such as the Democratic Progressive Party while northern voters prefer pan-blue ones such as Kuomintang. "Most outlets in Taiwan are either aligning themselves with the pan-Green camp that traditionally supports Taiwan's independence or the pan-Blue camp that traditionally advocates Taiwan's unification with China", said a Swedish reporter in Taipei.

The data of historical elections show a divide between urban versus rural voters, and northern versus southern Taiwanese. For instance, voters from municipalities in northern Taipei were more inclined to support same-sex marriage legalization. Among the top ten cities in favor of same-sex marriage were the far northern cities of Taipei, New Taipei, Hsinchu, and Keelung.

Landform

Northern Taiwan accounts for just about 20% of the total area of Taiwan but hosts virtually half of Taiwanese population, intimating Taiwanese people are exorbitantly gathering in northern Taiwan, leading to problems of overpopulation and slow growth of regions other than northern Taiwan.

An article published in a demographic and land economics journal by National Chengchi University suggested that the rising housing prices in northern Taiwan were simply a result of the central government's bias towards northern Taiwan because it implemented an array of projects that created a lot of position vacancies in the north areas the treatment of which is in a sharp contrast to central and southern Taiwan. This has led people to pursue real estate in an area the land supply of which is limited owing to geographic reasons, as there is more mountain, high land, and Table (landform) than plain in the northern part of Taiwan.

Population
As people in Taiwan continued to migrate to northern Taiwan, the number of seats in the Legislative Yuan in Taiwan representative of northern Taiwanese kept rising. Many worry about this can deepen the unequal pace of development between more urbanized northern Taiwan and the rural south.

Life expectancy
Residents in the northern part of Taiwan generally live longer than those in the south. Hsinchu and Taipei areas enjoyed highest life expectancy over the average of 80 years old.

Tainan and Kaohsiung, two major cities in southern Taiwan, had average life expectancy below 80 years old while other major cities in central Taiwan and northern Taiwan such as Taichung, Taoyuan, New Taipei, Taipei, Hsinchu all had the average life expectancy above 80. This is believed to be the one of the outcomes of disparity in such factors as access to medical resource, quality of life, personal fitness and others.

According to the scholars' statistics, there are 12 medical schools in Taiwan as of 2019 and over one-half of them are located in northern Taipei, intimating that medical services and education available in Taiwan are inordinately concentrated in northern Taiwan. Graduating 400 physicians per year, only 32 of them opted in serving in Kaohsiung in 2018 which exposed a severe undue medical service capacity between northern and southern Taiwan. "The central government hasn't even hosted any public-funded medical school across Kaohsiung, Pingtung, Penghu and Taitung yet!", said the dean of National Sun Yat-sen University in 2019.

According to Journal of Thoracic Oncology, the occurrence of lung cancer in southern Taiwan is now 15 times greater than that in northern Taiwan, which contributes to southern Taiwan's shorter life expectancy.

Education opportunity
Over half of the enrollees of National Taiwan University come from Taipei City and New Taipei City.

See also 
 Global North and Global South
 Northern and southern China

References

Society of Taiwan
Taiwan under Republic of China rule
Regionalism (politics)